Jackie Robinson (born May 20, 1955) is an American former professional basketball player.

Career
A 6'6" forward from UNLV, Robinson played in the National Basketball Association (NBA) from 1979 to 1981 as a member of the Seattle SuperSonics, Detroit Pistons, and Chicago Bulls.  He averaged 3.8 points per game in his NBA career and won an NBA Championship with Seattle in 1979.

Retirement
Afterward, Robinson played five years in Europe, and upon retirement held executive positions in several Las Vegas companies that worked in retail, real estate, construction, credit, and the food and beverage industries. He was a one-time owner of the Las Vegas Silver Bandits of the defunct International Basketball League, and the Las Vegas Slam of the American Basketball Association.

By 2008, Robinson and real estate veteran Michael Bellon had teamed up to develop a multibillion-dollar project on Bulloch and Gaffin's property called Elysium. It called for condos and hotel rooms, a dome-covered ocean-beach swimming complex, and more. It was to be located on the southeast of the Las Vegas Strip.

Robinson is currently working to build in Las Vegas the All Net Resort and Arena, a $4 billion hotel, shopping, and arena complex that could attract an NBA expansion team to Nevada. The project broke ground in October 2014, but construction will only begin by 2017 given Robinson had long development issues with Clark County before getting his approval.

References

External links
Career statistics

1955 births
Living people
African-American basketball players
American expatriate basketball people in Israel
American expatriate basketball people in Italy
American expatriate basketball people in Spain
American men's basketball players
Basketball players from Los Angeles
Chicago Bulls players
Detroit Pistons players
Houston Rockets draft picks
Libertas Liburnia Basket Livorno players
Maccabi Tel Aviv B.C. players
Montana Golden Nuggets players
Parade High School All-Americans (boys' basketball)
RCD Espanyol Bàsquet players
Seattle SuperSonics players
Small forwards
UNLV Runnin' Rebels basketball players
Western Basketball Association players
21st-century African-American people
20th-century African-American sportspeople